Southern Rhodesia was a landlocked self-governing British Crown colony in southern Africa, established in 1923 and consisting of British South Africa Company (BSAC) territories lying south of the Zambezi River. The region was informally known as south Zambesia until annexed by Britain at the behest of Cecil Rhodes's British South Africa Company, for whom the colony was named. The bounding territories were Bechuanaland (Botswana), Northern Rhodesia (Zambia), Moçambique (Mozambique), and the Transvaal Republic (for two brief periods instead the British Transvaal Colony, from 1910 the Union of South Africa, and then from 1961 the Republic of South Africa).

This southern region, known for its extensive gold reserves, was first purchased by the BSAC's Pioneer Column on the strength of a Mineral Concession extracted from its Matabele overlord, Lobengula, and various majority Mashona vassal chiefs in 1890. Though parts of the territory were laid claim to by the Bechuana and Portugal; its first people, the Bushmen or 'Khoisan' had possessed it from the very beginning of prehistory and had continued to inhabit some parts. Following the colony's unilateral dissolution in 1970 by the Republic of Rhodesia government, the Colony of Southern Rhodesia was re-established in 1979 as the predecessor state to the Republic of Zimbabwe Rhodesia which in turn was the predecessor state of the Republic of Zimbabwe. Its only true geographical borders are the Zambezi and Limpopo Rivers, its other boundaries being more or less arbitrary and merging imperceptibly with the peoples and domains of earlier chiefdoms from pre-colonial times.

The British colony was established de jure in 1923, having earlier been occupied, constructed and administered by the British South Africa Company and its sub-concessionaires who were mostly British subjects. In 1953, it was merged into the Federation of Rhodesia and Nyasaland, which lasted until 1963. Southern Rhodesia was renamed Rhodesia and remained a de jure British colony until 1980. However, the Rhodesian government issued a Unilateral Declaration of Independence (UDI) in 1965 and established a fully independent Rhodesia, which immediately became an unrecognised state. In 1979, it reconstituted itself under majority rule as Zimbabwe Rhodesia, which also failed to win international recognition. After a period of interim British control following the Lancaster House Agreement in December 1979, the country achieved internationally recognised independence as Zimbabwe in April 1980.

History

Origin as "Rhodesia"

Initially, the territory was referred to as "South Zambezia", a reference to the River Zambezi, until the name "Rhodesia" came into use in 1895. This was in honour of Cecil Rhodes, the British empire-builder and key figure during the British expansion into southern Africa. In 1888 Rhodes obtained mineral rights from the most powerful local traditional leaders through treaties such as the Rudd Concession and the Moffat Treaty, which was signed by King Lobengula of the Ndebele people. "Southern" was first used in 1898 and dropped from normal usage in 1964, on the break-up of the Federation of Rhodesia and Nyasaland. "Rhodesia" then remained the name of the country until the creation of Zimbabwe Rhodesia in 1979. Legally, from the British perspective, the name Southern Rhodesia continued to be used until 18 April 1980, when the Republic of Zimbabwe was promulgated.

The British government agreed that Rhodes' company, the British South Africa Company (BSAC), would administer the territory stretching from the Limpopo to Lake Tanganyika under charter as a protectorate. Queen Victoria signed the charter in 1889. Rhodes used this document in 1890 to justify sending the Pioneer Column, a group of white settlers protected by well-armed British South Africa Police (BSAP) and guided by the big game hunter Frederick Selous, through Matabeleland and into Shona territory to establish Fort Salisbury (now Harare). In 1893–1894, with the help of their new Maxim guns, the BSAP defeated the Ndebele in the First Matabele War, a war which also resulted in the death of King Lobengula and the death of most of the members of the Shangani Patrol. Shortly after the disastrous BSAP Jameson Raid into the Transvaal Republic, the Ndebele were led by their spiritual leader Mlimo against the white colonials and thus began the Second Matabele War (1896–97) which resulted in the extermination of nearly half the British settlers. After months of bloodshed, Mlimo was found and shot by the American scout Frederick Russell Burnham and soon thereafter Rhodes walked unarmed into the Ndebele stronghold in Matobo Hills and persuaded the impi to lay down their arms, effectively ending the revolt.

A legislative council was created in 1899 to manage the company's civil affairs, with a minority of elected seats, through which the BSAC had to pass government measures. As the company was a British institution in which settlers and capitalists owned most shares, and local black African tribal chiefs the remainder, and the electorate to this council was limited to those shareholders, the electorate was almost exclusively white settlers. Over time as more settlers arrived and a growing number had less than the amount of land required to own a share in the company or where in trades supporting the company as workers, successive activism resulted in first increasing the proportion of elected seats, and eventually allowing non-share holders the right to vote in the election. Prior to about 1918, the opinion among the electorate supported continued BSAC rule but opinion changed because of the development of the country and increased settlement. In addition, a decision in the British courts that land not in private ownership belonged to the British Crown rather than the BSAC gave great impetus to the campaign for self-government. In the resulting treaty government self-government, Crown lands which were sold to settlers allowed those settlers the right to vote in the self-governing colony.

Century up to independence

The territory north of the Zambezi was the subject of separate treaties with African chiefs: today, it forms the country of Zambia. The first BSAC Administrator for the western part was appointed for Barotseland in 1897 and for the whole of North-Western Rhodesia in 1900. The first BSAC Administrator for the eastern part, North-Eastern Rhodesia, was appointed in 1895. The whites in the territory south of the river paid it scant regard though, and generally used the name "Rhodesia" in a narrow sense to mean their part. The designation "Southern Rhodesia" was first used officially in 1898 in the Southern Rhodesia Order in Council of 20 October 1898, which applied to the area south of the Zambezi, and was more common after the BSAC merged the administration of the two northern territories as Northern Rhodesia in 1911.

As a result of the various treaties between the BSAC and the black tribes, Acts of Parliament delineating BSAC and Crown Lands, overlapping British colonial commission authority of both areas, the rights of the increasing number of British settlers and their descendants were given secondary review by authorities. This resulted in the formation of new movements for expanding the self-government of the Rhodesian people which saw BSAC rule as an impediment to further expansion.

The Southern Rhodesian Legislative Council election of 1920 returned a large majority of candidates of the Responsible Government Association and it became clear that BSAC rule was no longer practical. Opinion in the United Kingdom and South Africa favoured incorporation of Southern Rhodesia in the Union of South Africa, but, by forcing the pace of negotiation, the Southern Rhodesians obtained unfavourable terms and the electorate backed Responsible Government in a 1922 referendum.

In view of the outcome of the referendum, the territory was annexed by the United Kingdom on 12 September 1923. Shortly after annexation, on 1 October 1923, the first constitution for the new Colony of Southern Rhodesia came into force. Under this constitution Sir Charles Coghlan became the first Premier of Southern Rhodesia and upon his death in 1927 he was succeeded by Howard Unwin Moffat.

During World War II, Southern Rhodesian military units participated on the side of the United Kingdom. Southern Rhodesian forces were involved on many fronts including the East and North African campaigns, Italy, Madagascar and Burma. Southern Rhodesian forces had the highest loss ratio of any constituent element, colony, dependency or dominion of the British Empire forces during World War II. Additionally, the Rhodesian pilots earned the highest number of decorations and ace appellations of any group within the Empire. This resulted in the Royal Family paying an unusual state visit to the colony at the end of the war to thank the Rhodesian people.

Economically, Southern Rhodesia developed an economy that was narrowly based on production of a few primary products, notably, chrome and tobacco. It was therefore vulnerable to the economic cycle. The deep recession of the 1930s gave way to a post-war boom. This boom prompted the immigration of about 200,000 white settlers between 1945 and 1970, taking the white population up to 307,000. A large number of these immigrants were of British working-class origin. The black population was about 6 million.

In the 1940s, the founding of a university to serve central African countries was proposed. Such a university was eventually established in Salisbury, with funding provided by the British and Southern Rhodesian governments and some private sources. One condition of British funding was that student admission should be based on "academic achievement and good character" with no racial distinction. University College of Rhodesia (UCR) received its first intake of students in 1952. Until 1971 it awarded degrees of the Universities of London and Birmingham. In 1971 UCR became the University of Rhodesia and began awarding its own degrees. In 1980 it was renamed the University of Zimbabwe.

1953–1965

In 1953, with calls for independence mounting in many of its African possessions, the United Kingdom created the Federation of Rhodesia and Nyasaland (or the Central African Federation, CAF), which consisted of Southern Rhodesia, Northern Rhodesia and Nyasaland (now Zimbabwe, Zambia, and Malawi, respectively). The idea was to try to steer a middle road between the differing aspirations of the black nationalists, the colonial administration and the white settler population. The CAF sought to emulate the experience of Australia, Canada and South Africa – wherein groups of colonies had been federated together to form viable independent nations. Originally designed to be "an indissoluble federation", the CAF quickly started to unravel due to the low proportion of British and other white citizens in relation to the larger black populations. Additionally, by incorporating the tribes within the Federation as potential citizens, the Federation created the paradoxical situation of having a white elite owning most of the land and capital, whilst being completely dependent upon cheap black labour.

The Federation of Rhodesia and Nyasaland was dissolved on 1 January 1964. However, it was expected that only Nyasaland would be let go, whilst the remainder of Rhodesia both north and south would be united. Although Northern Rhodesia had a white population of over 100,000, as well as additional British military and civil units and their dependents, most of these were relatively new to the region, were primarily in the extraction business, had little landed interests, and were more amenable to allowing black nationalism than the Southern Rhodesians. Accordingly, Britain granted independence to Northern Rhodesia on 24 October 1964. However, when the new nationalists changed its name to Zambia and began tentatively at first and later in rapid march an Africanisation campaign, Southern Rhodesia remained a British colony, resisting attempts to bring in majority rule. The colony attempted to change its name to Rhodesia although this was not recognised by the United Kingdom. The majority of the Federation's military and financial assets went to Southern Rhodesia, since the British Government did not wish to see them fall into the hands of the nationalist leaders, and since Southern Rhodesia had borne the major expenses of running the Federation. With regard to the latter, however, Northern Rhodesia was the wealthiest of the three member states (due to its vast copper mines) and had contributed more to the overall building of infrastructure than the other two members did. Southern Rhodesia, recognising an inevitable dissolution of the Federation, was quick to use federal funds in building its infrastructure ahead of the others. A key component of this was the building of the Kariba Dam and its hydroelectric facility (shafts, control centre, etc.), which was situated on the Southern Rhodesian side of the Zambezi Gorge. This situation caused some embarrassment for the Zambian government later when it was a "front line state" in support of insurgents into Rhodesia in that its major source of electric power was controlled by the Rhodesian state.

Return to "Rhodesia"

With the protectorate of Northern Rhodesia no longer in existence, in 1964, Southern Rhodesia reverted to the name Rhodesia (see next section).

In 1965, Rhodesia unilaterally declared itself independent under a white-dominated government led by Ian Smith. After a long civil war ensued between the white (until 1979) government and two African majority, Soviet Bloc-aligned 'liberation movements' (Zimbabwe People's Revolutionary Army and Zimbabwe African National Liberation Army). The Salisbury government, realizing the situation was untenable, and facing strong international pressure, concluded the Internal Settlement with black nationalist leaders in March 1978. A general election a year later resulted in the creation of a unity government, which in December 1979 concluded the Lancaster House Agreement, whereby Britain resumed control of the country for a brief period before granting independence to the renamed Zimbabwe on 18 April 1980.

Legal aspects of the name since 1964

On 7 October 1964, the Southern Rhodesian government announced that when Northern Rhodesia achieved independence as Zambia, the Southern Rhodesian government would officially become known as the Rhodesian Government and the colony would become known as Rhodesia.

On 23 October of that year, the Minister of Internal Affairs notified the press that the Constitution would be amended to make this official. The Legislative Assembly then passed an Interpretation Bill to declare that the colony could be referred to as Rhodesia. The Bill received its third reading on 9 December 1964, and passed to the Governor for royal assent.

However, no royal assent was granted to the Bill. Section 3 of the Southern Rhodesia (Annexation) Order 1923 provided that Southern Rhodesia "shall be known as the Colony of Southern Rhodesia" and the Southern Rhodesia (Constitution) Act 1961 and the Order-in-Council which followed it both referred to it as such. The country's name had been agreed previously by both Southern Rhodesia and the United Kingdom, and it was therefore outside the powers of Southern Rhodesian institutions to amend them unilaterally. Notwithstanding the Governor's lack of assent to the Interpretation Bill the United Kingdom's Colonial Office was, by 1965, officially using the name "Rhodesia" in British Government-issued Gazettes of the period (for instance see: The 1965 Queen's Birthday Honours of 12 June 1965).

The Rhodesian government, which had begun using the new name anyway, did not press the issue. The Unilateral Declaration of Independence, adopted on 11 November 1965, was in the name of "Rhodesia", which remained unchanged by the declaration of a republic in 1970, the title of the republican constitution of 1969, like the constitution before it, being "Constitution of Rhodesia".

While the new name was widely used, 'Southern Rhodesia' remained the colony's formal name in United Kingdom constitutional theory: for example, the Act passed by the United Kingdom Parliament declaring the independence a legal nullity was entitled the Southern Rhodesia Act 1965.

Following the signing of the Lancaster House Agreement, the Parliament of the United Kingdom passed the Southern Rhodesia Constitution (Interim Provisions) Order 1979, establishing the offices of Governor and Deputy Governor of Southern Rhodesia, filled by Lord Soames and Sir Antony Duff respectively.

The new Governor arrived in Salisbury on 12 December 1979, and on that day the Parliament of Zimbabwe Rhodesia handed power over to him by passing the Constitution of Zimbabwe Rhodesia (Amendment) (No. 4) Act, declaring that "Zimbabwe Rhodesia shall cease to be an independent State and become part of Her Majesty's dominions". After elections in February 1980, the colony ceased to exist when the new country of Zimbabwe became independent at midnight on 17 April 1980.

Judiciary

List of Chief Justices of Southern Rhodesia:

See also

Administrative posts of the British South Africa Company in Southern Rhodesia
Albert John Lutuli, a famous South African born in Southern Rhodesia
Governor-General of the Federation of Rhodesia and Nyasaland
History of Zimbabwe
List of presidents of Zimbabwe
President of Rhodesia
Southern Rhodesia in World War I
Tati Concessions Land, a region detached from Matebeleland and annexed to the Bechuanaland Protectorate

References

Bibliography

External links 

 
 

 
.
History of the British Empire
History of the Commonwealth of Nations
History of Zimbabwe
Southern Rhodesia
Former colonies in Africa
Former countries in Africa
20th century in Rhodesia
20th century in Zimbabwe
States and territories established in 1923
States and territories disestablished in 1953
States and territories established in 1963
States and territories disestablished in 1965
States and territories established in 1979
States and territories disestablished in 1980
1923 establishments in Africa
1953 disestablishments in Africa
1923 establishments in the British Empire
1953 disestablishments in the British Empire
1965 establishments in Africa
1960s establishments in Rhodesia
1960s disestablishments in Rhodesia
1979 establishments in Africa
1970s establishments in Rhodesia
1980 disestablishments in Zimbabwe
English-speaking countries and territories
British Empire
Zimbabwe and the Commonwealth of Nations
Rhodesian Bush War